Baron Teynham, of Teynham in the County of Kent, is a title in the Peerage of England and the Peerage of the United Kingdom. It was created in 1616 for Sir John Roper. His great-great-grandson, the fifth Baron, served as Lord Lieutenant of Kent. The latter's third son, the eighth Baron, married, as his second wife, Anne Barrett-Lennard, 16th Baroness Dacre. His eldest son from this marriage, Charles Roper, was the father of Trevor Charles Roper, 18th Baron Dacre, and Gertrude Trevor Roper, 19th Baroness Dacre (see the Baron Dacre for more information). His youngest son from this marriage, Reverend Richard Henry Roper, was the great-great-great-grandfather of the historian Hugh Trevor-Roper, Baron Dacre of Glanton.

The eighth Baron was succeeded by his eldest son from his first marriage to Catherine Smythe, the ninth Baron. He died unmarried and was succeeded by his younger brother, the tenth Baron. The latter's grandson, the fourteenth Baron, assumed in 1788 by Royal licence the surname of Curzon in lieu of his patronymic but in 1813 he resumed by Royal licence his original surname of Roper in addition to that of Curzon. His great-great-grandson, the nineteenth Baron, served as Deputy Chairman of Committees in the House of Lords from 1946 to 1959.  the title is held by the twenty-first Baron, who succeeded in that year.

The family seat is Pylewell Park, near Lymington, Hampshire.

Barons Teynham (1616)
John Roper, 1st Baron Teynham (c. 1534 – 1618)
Christopher Roper, 2nd Baron Teynham (1561–1622)
John Roper, 3rd Baron Teynham (c. 1591 – 1628)
Christopher Roper, 4th Baron Teynham (1621–1673)
Christopher Roper, 5th Baron Teynham (died 1689)
John Roper, 6th Baron Teynham (died 1697)
Christopher Roper, 7th Baron Teynham (died 1699)
Henry Roper, 8th Baron Teynham (c. 1676 – 1723)
Philip Roper, 9th Baron Teynham (1707–1727)
Henry Roper, 10th Baron Teynham (c. 1708 – 1781)
Henry Roper, 11th Baron Teynham (1734–1786)
Henry Roper, 12th Baron Teynham (1764–1800)
John Roper, 13th Baron Teynham (1767–1824)
Henry Francis Roper-Curzon, 14th Baron Teynham (1767–1842)
Henry Roper-Curzon, 15th Baron Teynham (1789–1842)
George Henry Roper-Curzon, 16th Baron Teynham (1798–1889)
Henry George Roper-Curzon, 17th Baron Teynham (1822–1892)
Henry John Philip Sidney Roper-Curzon, 18th Baron Teynham (1867–1936)
Christopher John Henry Roper-Curzon, 19th Baron Teynham (1896–1972)
John Christopher Ingham Roper-Curzon, 20th Baron Teynham (1928–2021)
David John Henry Ingham Roper-Curzon, 21st Baron Teynham (b. 1965)

The heir apparent is the present holder’s son, Henry Christopher John Ingham Alexis Roper-Curzon (b. 1986)

See also
Baron Dacre
Hugh Trevor-Roper, Baron Dacre of Glanton
Birdy (Jasmine van den Bogaerde), granddaughter of the 20th Baron

Notes

References

External links
Baron Teynham (Linsted, Kent England)
Roper Genealogy and Memorials

1616 establishments in England
Baronies in the Peerage of England
Noble titles created in 1616
!